Sudbury Priory is a former Dominican priory in Sudbury, Suffolk, England.

Sudbury Priory may also refer to:

 Sudbury Benedictine Priory, a former Benedictine priory in Sudbury, Suffolk
 Sudbury Priory, a house in Sudbury, London

See also
 Sudbury  College, a former religious community in Sudbury, Suffolk

Religious buildings and structures disambiguation pages